The following is a list of episodes of the American sitcom ALF. Most episode titles derive from those of American and British popular songs.

Series overview

Episodes

Season 1 (1986–87)

Season 2 (1987–88)

Season 3 (1988–89)

Season 4 (1989–90)

See also
 Project ALF, a 1996 TV movie that functions as a sequel to the final episode (although with many different actors thus getting bad reviews)

References

ALF (TV series)
Lists of American science fiction television series episodes
Lists of American sitcom episodes